The Ship is an office building in Derriford, Plymouth, England.  It was the offices of The Herald and Western Morning News for many years until their move to Millbay in 2013.  It was recommended for listing at Grade II* by Historic England in April 2015.

The building is now in use as Adrenaline trampoline fun park and a Clip ‘n Climb activity centre.

The Building

The Ship was designed by Nicholas Grimshaw and is constructed of glass and steel in the form of a ship.

Awards
 British Constructional Steelwork Association Structural Steel Design Award 1993
 Royal Fine Art Building of the Year Awards 1993
 British Construction Industry Awards 1993
 The Royal Institute of British Architects Award 1994.

Gallery
The Grimshaw partnership website has a selection of photographs of the Western Morning News HQ, known locally as "The Ship", since the WMN vacated the building in 2013.

History
The Ship was built in 1992-3 as the headquarters for The Evening Herald and the Western Morning News in the Derriford area of Plymouth, Devon. The architect was Sir Nicholas Grimshaw CBE. The building was vacated by the newspapers in 2013, after a change of ownership in 2012 from Daily Mail and General Trust plc to Local World which resulted in relocation to smaller offices at Milbay in Plymouth, and the building has since stood empty. 

The owners advertised the building for sale, but, as of 10 April 2015, no buyers had come forward, and the owners served Plymouth City Council with a notice that they wish to demolish the building. Sir Nicholas Grimshaw made his own suggestions as to what use could be made of the building now that it is redundant as a newspaper headquarters and printing press. On 22 July 2015 it was announced that the building had been awarded a Grade II* listing by Historic England saving it from demolition.

References

External links
Estate Agent Sales Brochure 2014
Grimshaw partners website: Western Morning News HQ
Western Morning News website
Evening Herald Website

Buildings and structures in Plymouth, Devon
Office buildings completed in 1993
Industrial buildings completed in 1993